Antilope subtorta is an extinct species of antelope that lived during the Pliocene in the Siwaliks of Pakistan.

A. subtorta is considered the oldest known member of the genus. In comparison to the living blackbuck, the horns were less twisted.

References

Prehistoric even-toed ungulates
Pliocene even-toed ungulates
Prehistoric bovids
Pliocene mammals of Asia
Fossil taxa described in 1937